Ondřej Zahustel (born 18 June 1991) is a professional Czech football player who plays for the B-team of Mladá Boleslav.

International career
Zahustel made his senior debut for the Czech Republic on 13 November 2015 and scored one of the goals in a 4-1 win over Serbia.

References

External links
 
 

1991 births
Living people
Czech footballers
Czech Republic youth international footballers
Czech Republic under-21 international footballers
Association football midfielders
Czech First League players
FK Mladá Boleslav players
AC Sparta Prague players
1. FC Slovácko players
Sportspeople from Mladá Boleslav
Czech Republic international footballers